Term Diocese may refer to:

 Roman diocese, administrative unit from the period of late Roman Empire.
 Diocese, ecclesiastical unit of various Christian churches.

See also
 Archbishop (disambiguation)
 Bishop (disambiguation)
 Vicar (disambiguation)
 Exarch (disambiguation)